Elysius discopunctata is a moth of the family Erebidae. It was described by Max Gaede in 1923. It is found in Brazil.

References

discopunctata
Moths described in 1923
Moths of South America